Hoplocorypha is a genus of mantises belonging to the family Thespidae.

The species of this genus are found in Africa.

Species:

Hoplocorypha acuta 
Hoplocorypha bicornis 
Hoplocorypha boromensis 
Hoplocorypha bottegi 
Hoplocorypha boviformis 
Hoplocorypha brevicollis 
Hoplocorypha cacomana 
Hoplocorypha carli 
Hoplocorypha congica 
Hoplocorypha dentata 
Hoplocorypha distinguenda 
Hoplocorypha foliata 
Hoplocorypha fumosa 
Hoplocorypha galeata 
Hoplocorypha garuana 
Hoplocorypha hamulifera 
Hoplocorypha lacualis 
Hoplocorypha lobata 
Hoplocorypha macra 
Hoplocorypha mellea 
Hoplocorypha montana 
Hoplocorypha nana 
Hoplocorypha narocana 
Hoplocorypha nigerica 
Hoplocorypha nigra 
Hoplocorypha perplexa 
Hoplocorypha picea 
Hoplocorypha punctata 
Hoplocorypha rapax 
Hoplocorypha salfii 
Hoplocorypha saussurii 
Hoplocorypha sordida 
Hoplocorypha striata 
Hoplocorypha turneri 
Hoplocorypha ugandana 
Hoplocorypha vittata 
Hoplocorypha wittei

References

Hoplocorypha